The 2009 WNBA season is the 4th for the Chicago Sky of the Women's National Basketball Association. Steven Key returned as coach - marking the first time in franchise history that the Sky did not have to hire a new coach after 1 year. The Sky received the 3rd Overall pick in the 2009 WNBA Draft and used it on Maryland guard Kristi Toliver.

Transactions

Houston Comets Dispersal Draft
With the Houston Comets ceasing operation and based on the 2008 records of teams, the Sky selected 3rd in the Dispersal Draft.

WNBA Draft

Trades and Roster Changes

Roster
{| class="toccolours" style="font-size: 95%; width: 100%;"
|-
! colspan="2"  style="background:#4b90cc; color:#Fbb726"|2009 Chicago Sky Roster
|- style="text-align:center; background:#fbb726; color:#fff;"
! Players !! Coaches
|- 
| valign="top" |
{| class="sortable" style="background:none; margin:0; width:100%;"
|-
! Pos. !! # !! Nat. !! Name !! Ht. !! Wt. !! From
|-

Depth

Schedule

Preseason

|-  style="text-align:center; background:#bfb;"
| 1 || May 22 || 8:30pm || Detroit || 71-67 || Sylvia Fowles (21) || Sylvia Fowles (9) || Jia Perkins (5) || UIC Pavilion  3,283 || 1-0
|-  style="text-align:center; background:#fbb;"
| 2 || May 27 || 11:00am || @ Detroit || 68-78 || Kristi Toliver (17) || DupreeBass (7) || PriceToliver (3) || Palace of Auburn Hills  3,952 || 1-1
|-  style="text-align:center; background:#fbb;"
| 3 || May 28 || 7:00pm || @ Indiana || 67-74 || DupreeChen (15) || Shyra Ely (8) || Candice Dupree (3) || Conseco Fieldhouse  6,457 || 1-2
|-  style="text-align:center; background:#bfb;"
| 4 || June 2 || 8:00pm || E League || 102-55 ||Candice Dupree (20)  ||DupreeFowles (7) || Kristi Toliver (6) || UIC Pavilion  3,488 || 2-2
|-

Regular Season

|-  style="text-align:center; background:#fbb;"
| 1 || June 6 || 8:00pm || @ Minnesota || NBA TVFSN-N || 85-102 || Jia Perkins (24) || Jia Perkins (6) || Dominique Canty (6) || Target Center  8,708 || 0-1
|-  style="text-align:center; background:#bfb;"
| 2 || June 12 || 8:30pm || Atlanta || CN100NBA TV || 81-73 || Candice Dupree (23) || Candice Dupree (8) || Jia Perkins (8) || UIC Pavilion  5,689 || 1-1
|-  style="text-align:center; background:#bfb;"
| 3 || June 14 || 6:00pm || Seattle ||  || 64-57 || Candice Dupree (14) || Sylvia Fowles (15) || Brooke Wyckoff (3) || UIC Pavilion  2,681 || 2-1
|-  style="text-align:center; background:#bfb;"
| 4 || June 16 || 8:00pm || Connecticut ||  || 78-75 || Jia Perkins (25) || Sylvia Fowles (10) || Jia Perkins (5) || UIC Pavilion  2,396 || 3-1
|-  style="text-align:center; background:#fbb;"
| 5 || June 19 || 7:00pm || @ Connecticut ||  || 61-91 || Kristi Toliver (14) || Sylvia Fowles (9) || Armintie Price (3) || Mohegan Sun Arena  5,892 || 3-2
|-  style="text-align:center; background:#fbb;"
| 6 || June 20 || 7:00pm || @ Washington ||  || 72-81 || Jia Perkins (15) || Armintie Price (7) || Jia Perkins (6) || Verizon Center  11,745 || 3-3
|-  style="text-align:center; background:#bfb;"
| 7 || June 23 || 12:00pm || @ Atlanta ||  || 99-98 (OT) || Jia Perkins (22) || Candice Dupree (10) || Jia Perkins (6) || Philips Arena  10,351 || 4-3
|-  style="text-align:center; background:#bfb;"
| 8 || June 27 || 8:00pm || Washington ||  || 68-63 || Candice Dupree (23) || Sylvia Fowles (10) || Jia Perkins (5) || UIC Pavilion  3,918 || 5-3
|-  style="text-align:center; background:#bfb;"
| 9 || June 30 || 8:00pm || Sacramento ||  || 74-72 || Jia Perkins (17) || Sylvia Fowles (14) || Jia Perkins (8) || UIC Pavilion  2,721 || 6-3
|-

|-  style="text-align:center; background:#fbb;"
| 10 || July 3 || 8:00pm || @ San Antonio ||  || 72-85 || Armintie Price (17) || Shyra Ely (5) || Dominique Canty (5) || AT&T Center  6,662 || 6-4
|-  style="text-align:center; background:#fbb;"
| 11 || July 7 || 10:00pm || @ Sacramento ||  || 73-83 || Jia Perkins (21) || Jia Perkins (5) || Jia Perkins (6) || ARCO Arena  5,672 || 6-5
|-  style="text-align:center; background:#fbb;"
| 12 || July 8 || 10:00pm || @ Phoenix ||  || 70-90 || Candice Dupree (22) || Candice Dupree (12) || Armintie Price (2) || US Airways Center  5,597 || 6-6
|-  style="text-align:center; background:#fbb;"
| 13 || July 10 || 8:30pm || Indiana ||  || 54-83 || Shyra Ely (12) || Candice Dupree (8) || Kristi Toliver (4) || UIC Pavilion  4,021 || 6-7
|-  style="text-align:center; background:#bfb;"
| 14 || July 12 || 9:00pm || @ Seattle || NBA TVFSN-NW || 86-81 || Candice Dupree (28) || Candice Dupree (7) || Kristi Toliver (7) || KeyArena  6,796 || 7-7
|-  style="text-align:center; background:#fbb;"
| 15 || July 15 || 1:00pm || @ Indiana ||  || 74-84 || Candice Dupree (17) || Candice Dupree (10) || CantyChenToliver (3) || Conseco Fieldhouse  10,050 || 7-8
|-  style="text-align:center; background:#bfb;"
| 16 || July 19 || 6:00pm|| San Antonio || NBA TVCN100 || 85-75 || Jia Perkins (29) || Candice Dupree (11) || Dominique Canty (6) || UIC Pavilion  3,282 || 8-8
|-  style="text-align:center; background:#fbb;"
| 17 || July 22 || 12:30pm || New York ||  || 70-77 || Sylvia Fowles (15) || Candice Dupree (11) || Dominique Canty (4) || UIC Pavilion  5,881 || 8-9
|-  style="text-align:center; background:#fbb;"
| 18 || July 23 || 7:00pm || @ Washington || ESPN2 || 64-75 || Jia Perkins (14) || Sylvia Fowles (7) || Kristi Toliver (2) || Verizon Center  11,651 || 8-10
|-  style="text-align:center; background:#bfb;"
| 19 || July 29 || 8:00pm || Los Angeles ||  || 75-63 || Jia Perkins (18) || Sylvia Fowles (7) || Candice Dupree (5) || UIC Pavilion  5,633 || 9-10
|-

|-  style="text-align:center; background:#bfb;"
| 20 || August 1 || 8:00pm || Connecticut || NBA TVWCTX || 84-72 || Candice Dupree (23) || Candice Dupree (8) || Dominique Canty (6) || UIC Pavilion  3,071 || 10-10
|-  style="text-align:center; background:#fbb;"
| 21 || August 5 || 7:00pm || @ Indiana || NBA TVCN100 || 67-76 || Candice Dupree (19) || Candice Dupree (13) || Dominique Canty (4) || Conseco Fieldhouse  6,581 || 10-11
|-  style="text-align:center; background:#bfb;"
| 22 || August 8 || 7:00pm || @ Atlanta ||  || 82-80 || Erin Thorn (20) || Candice Dupree (11) || Jia Perkins (5) || Philips Arena  5,424 || 11-11
|-  style="text-align:center; background:#fbb;"
| 23 || August 9 || 6:00pm || @ Detroit ||  || 58-64 || Candice Dupree (16) || Sylvia Fowles (18) || Brooke Wyckoff (3) || Palace of Auburn Hills  6,893 || 11-12
|-  style="text-align:center; background:#bfb;"
| 24 || August 14 || 7:30pm || @ New York || NBA TVCN100MSG || 88-77 || Sylvia Fowles (22) || DupreeFowles (9) || Dominique Canty (6) || Madison Square Garden  9,832 || 12-12
|-  style="text-align:center; background:#bfb;"
| 25 || August 15 || 8:00pm || Minnesota ||  || 79-76 || Erin Thorn (17) || Candice Dupree (14) || Dominique Canty (8) || UIC Pavilion  3,877 || 13-12
|-  style="text-align:center; background:#fbb;"
| 26 || August 18 || 8:00pm || Phoenix ||  || 99-106 || Shyra Ely (26) || Candice Dupree (7) || Candice Dupree (5) || UIC Pavilion  TBA || 13-13
|-  style="text-align:center; background:#fbb;"
| 27 || August 22 || 8:00pm || Detroit ||  || 67-76 || Candice Dupree (20) || Candice Dupree (14) || CantyDupreeThorn (3) || UIC Pavilion  5,167 || 13-14
|-  style="text-align:center; background:#fbb;"
| 28 || August 25 || 10:00pm || @ Los Angeles || ESPN2 || 63-75 || Shyra Ely (16) || Candice Dupree (8) || Dominique Canty (4) || STAPLES Center  9,615 || 13-15
|-  style="text-align:center; background:#bfb;"
| 29 || August 28 || 8:30pm || New York || NBA TVCN100MSG || 96-77 || Candice Dupree (26) || Candice Dupree (6) || Candice Dupree (4) || UIC Pavilion  3,707 || 14-15
|-  style="text-align:center; background:#fbb;"
| 30 || August 30 || 4:00pm || @ New York ||  || 63-77 || Candice Dupree (15) || Candice Dupree (13) || Erin Thorn (7) || Madison Square Garden  8,685 || 14-16
|-

|-  style="text-align:center; background:#bfb;"
| 31 || September 4 || 8:30pm || Washington ||  || 92-86 || Sylvia Fowles (13) || Candice Dupree (10) || Jia Perkins (5) || UIC Pavilion  3,241 || 15-16
|-  style="text-align:center; background:#fbb;"
| 32 || September 6 || 6:00pm || @ Detroit ||  || 75-84 || DupreeEly (18) || Shyra Ely (8) || ElySharp (3) || Palace of Auburn Hills  6,619 || 15-17
|-  style="text-align:center; background:#bfb;"
| 33 || September 10 || 8:00pm || Indiana  ||  || 86-79 || Kristi Toliver (19) || Candice Dupree (9) || Dominique Canty (6) || UIC Pavilion  2,902 || 16-17
|-  style="text-align:center; background:#fbb;"
| 34 || September 12 || 8:00pm || Detroit ||  || 69-80 || Candice Dupree (27) || Candice Dupree (7) || Dominique Canty (6) || UIC Pavilion  5,334 || 16-18
|-

| All games are viewable on WNBA LiveAccess

Standings

Statistics

Regular Season

Awards and Honors

References

External links

Chicago Sky seasons
Chicago
Chicago Sky